Reza Fallahzadeh (born 11 December 1976) is an Iranian professional futsal coach and former player. He is currently head coach of Buta Pars Iranian in the Iran Futsal's 1st Division.

Honours

Player
 Iranian Futsal Super League
 Champion (1): 2007–08 (Tam Iran Khodro)

Manager
 Iran Futsal's 1st Division
 Champion (1): 2013–14 (Moghavemat Alborz)
 Iran Futsal's 2nd Division
 Champion (1): 2013 (Moghavemat Alborz)
 Indonesia Pro Futsal League
 Champion (2): 2017 - 2018 (Vamos Mataram)

References 

1976 births
Living people
Iranian men's futsal players
Persepolis FSC players
Esteghlal FSC players
Tam Iran Khodro FSC players
Iranian futsal coaches